Knup may refer to:

Khmer National United Party
Adrian Knup